Blubber is a children's novel by Judy Blume first published in 1974. The narrator of the story is Jill Brenner, a Pennsylvania fifth-grader who joins her classmates in ostracizing and bullying Linda, an awkward and overweight girl. Linda gives an oral class report about whales and is hence nicknamed "Blubber" by her peers.

Plot
The story takes place in Radnor, Pennsylvania, a suburb of Philadelphia.

The entire class ostracizes Linda. Although she is not the heaviest student in their class, Wendy and her best friend and sidekick Caroline are Linda's chief tormentors and bully her both physically and psychologically (forcing her to say things such as "I am Blubber, the Smelly Whale of Class 206"). As a member of Wendy's clique, Jill participates in the bullying without remorse, though Wendy and Caroline are usually the instigators. Linda confronts Jill and threatens her with revenge after one incident, but Jill dismisses the threat, confident of her status and protection as one of Wendy's circle.

Jill and her friend Tracy play a prank on their grouch of a neighbor, Mr. Machinist, on Halloween, stuffing raw rotten eggs into his mailbox, but are later identified from a photo taken by Mr. Machinist and are made to rake the leaves in his backyard as punishment. While raking, Jill and Tracy find they need to use the restroom. They urinate all over Mr. Machinist's trees as a sort of payback.

Remembering Linda's threat, Jill suspects that "Blubber" was the one who tattled on her and Tracy; Tracy, however, suspects Wendy and Caroline, which infuriates Wendy. To appease Wendy, Jill suggests that the class hold a mock trial for Linda (with Wendy, naturally, as judge, and a jury made up of several classmates). To this suggestion, Tracy remarks that she thinks Jill is scared of Wendy. Jill soon realizes that Tracy is right.

The "trial" falls apart when Wendy, as judge, denies Linda her right to a "lawyer", and Jill, frustrated with herself for so readily following Wendy's lead, finally stands up to Wendy, who also arouses Jill's anger by making a racial slur against Tracy, who is Chinese-American. Linda, who has been locked in the classroom closet, is set free by Jill. Wendy, furious that Jill has dared to question her authority, threatens to make Jill "sorry [she was] ever born".

Jill comes to school the next morning to find that Wendy has made good on her threat and turned the entire class against her, tagging her with the nickname "B. B." (short for "Baby Brenner"). Jill's tormentors include Linda, who has joined with Wendy and is more than willing to bully one of her former harassers.

Jill believes that she can be stronger by playing into the jokes. However, when she tries to laugh at their taunting, they even use that to make fun of her. Instead, Jill goes further to fight against the bullying by setting Wendy, Linda, and Wendy's best friend Caroline against each other, telling Caroline she should make her own decisions and that she is no longer Wendy's best friend, that Linda has taken her place, which Linda affirms. Caroline is hurt and Wendy is furious at Linda. Jill makes friends with Rochelle, a quiet girl in the class who has never participated in the bullying.

By the end, although the class atmosphere is tense, no one is being singled out or picked on. Jill comments (the book is in a first-person narrative) on how the friendships in the class have changed completely in the classroom but how Tracy is a friend she can always count on having.

Characters
Jill Brenner — The main character in the book. She is thin to the point of being  underweight  and goes to Hillside School, a school for fifth and sixth graders. She is shown to be average, and she is one of the many people in the class who bullies Linda. She is best friends with Tracy Wu, and becomes friends with Wendy and Caroline, but the friendship ends abruptly when she dares to challenge Wendy's authority. Also, at the end of the book she becomes good friends with a new girl in her class named Rochelle. Unlike many of Judy Blume's main characters, Jill has a mean nature and is quite cruel in her taunting, though she chiefly follows Wendy and Caroline's lead. She is in Mrs. Minish's fifth grade class. Like all the other students in the class, Jill calls Linda "Blubber". She dresses as a flenser for Halloween, instead of being a witch like she was for the last three years. Her chief hobby is stamp collecting, and she has problems with math.

Wendy — The class president of Jill's class. She is an excellent student, smart, popular, and powerful, but uses her power to bully others and control her classmates. She is best friends with Caroline for most of the book but near the end of the book becomes best friends with Linda. At the very end she ends up becoming best friends with Laurie. She likes salami a lot, so she always trades lunches with Caroline. In addition, Wendy is manipulative and an excellent liar. She nicknames Linda "Blubber", because Linda presented a report on the whale and she is large-bodied. She lives in Hidden Valley with Caroline, Robby, and Linda. She has never been in the same class as Jill, Donna, Bruce, or Robby before this year.

Caroline — Another classmate of Jill's. She is Wendy's best friend and her sidekick in bullying Linda. She always does what Wendy says, and seems to be a little bit afraid of her. Caroline always backs up what Wendy says. She loves tuna fish sandwiches, so she trades lunches with Wendy every day. She calls Linda "Blubber," like almost everybody else in the class. She lives in Hidden Valley with Wendy, Robby, and Linda. Near the end of the book, Caroline becomes best friends with Donna Davidson. She has never been in the same class as Jill, Donna, Bruce, or Robby before this year.

Linda Fischer — A girl in Jill's class who is nicknamed "Blubber," since she did a report on whale's fat (blubber) and is full-figured and plain. She also is very submissive and does not know how to defend or assert herself. Near the end of the book, she becomes best friends with Wendy, but by the end, she is a loner again. She lives in Hidden Valley with Wendy, Caroline, and Robby. This is the second year she has been in Jill, Donna, Robby, and Bruce's class. By coincidence, she runs into Jill at Warren Winkler's Bar Mitzvah, as her parents are also friends with the Winklers as are the Brenners.

Kenny Brenner — Jill's younger brother. He is in fourth grade at Longmeadow School. He wins the Halloween contest for the most original costume, because he dresses as a witch, but with a cigar, and yellow goggles. He always recites facts from his Guinness Book of World Records and often annoys Jill.

Tracy Wu — Jill's next-door neighbor and best friend. She is a Chinese-American, and a stamp collector, like Jill. She and her family own a lot of animals. Her Halloween costume was Big Bird, and as a result won a prize for the Most Beautiful Costume. She is in a different fifth grade class, and has a much better teacher who is always thinking up fun ways for his students to learn.

Gordon Brenner — Jill and Kenny's father. He works as a tax accountant for a living.

Ann Brenner — Jill and Kenny's mother. She is trying to stop smoking cigarettes. She can blow very big chewing gum bubbles. She swears around the house often, and is okay with her kids doing it, as long as they know that there are some people who don't approve of those words. Her job involves working with computers.

Rochelle — A new girl in school. She is the only one who tried to defend Linda. In the end she becomes friends with Jill.

Donna Davidson — A girl in Jill's class. She likes horses and dresses as a horse for Halloween every year except for this year, when she is a jockey. She has been in the same class as Jill, Bruce, and Robby since kindergarten; this is her second year with Linda and her first year with Wendy and Caroline. In the end she becomes best friends with Caroline.

Robby Winters — A student in Jill's class. He has been in Donna, Bruce, and Jill's class since kindergarten.

Bruce Bonaventura — A boy in Jill's class. He is the fattest kid in the grade. He has been in the same class as Jill, Donna and Robby since kindergarten, this is his second year with Linda, and his first year with Wendy and Caroline.

Mr. Machinist — A mean man who lives in Hidden Valley. He reports Jill and Tracy to their parents for putting rotten eggs in his mailbox on Halloween. He always turns the hose on kids who venture onto his property.

Warren Winkler — A boy who is the son of Gordon's friend. He is Jewish. Jill and her family attend his bar mitzvah, as do Linda and her family. He can read Hebrew perfectly. Jill dislikes him.

Mrs. Sandmeier - The Brenner family's Swiss-born housekeeper and nanny to Jill and Kenny. She is trilingual (part of her job is to teach Jill and Kenny to speak French) and an excellent cook.

Great Maudie - Jill and Kenny's great-aunt who moves in as nanny to the children while Mrs. Sandmeier is on vacation. She is a hippie who practices yoga and forces health foods like "wheat germ mush" on the children.

Mrs. Minish — Jill's very strict fifth grade teacher.

Irwin — Jill's classmate. Catches Linda during the "Blubber Trial" when Linda tried to escape.

Judy Blume on Blubber
According to Judy Blume in a short essay published in a recent reprint of the novel, the plot of Blubber was inspired by a very similar real-life incident involving her daughter's 5th grade class, in which one girl was singled out for torment by the class leader, who led her classmates in bullying her. "My daughter was the shy, quiet girl in the class, the observer, like Rochelle", Blume wrote. "She was upset by what was going on, but she didn't know what to do about it. She was scared. Like many other kids in that class, she worried she could wind up the next victim of the bullying." Blume also explained that she wrote Blubber to encourage children who see bullying taking place, as well as the bullies' victims themselves, to tell someone they trust rather than keep it to themselves.

Reception

Awards 
Blubber has received the following accolades:

 North Dakota Children's Choice Award (1983)
 Pacific Northwest Library Association Young Reader's Choice Award (1977)

Controversy 
According to the American Library Association, like many of Judy Blume's books, Blubber has frequently been at the center of controversy in the United States. It landed on the list of top 100 banned and challenged books in between 1990 and 1999, as well as between 2000 and 2009.

See also

 List of most commonly challenged books in the U.S.

Footnotes

External links
 Judy Blume's website
 Blubber (Paperback) at amazon.com

1974 American novels
American young adult novels
Novels by Judy Blume
Novels set in Philadelphia
Novels about bullying
Fiction with unreliable narrators